1. FC Kleve is a German association football club from the city of Kleve, North Rhine-Westphalia very near the Dutch border. The club was established in 2000 out of the merger of VfB Lohengrin 03 Kleve and Sportclub Kleve 63. The footballers are today part of a larger sports club that also has departments for aerobics, gymnastics, Karate, and tennis.



History

Sportclub Kleve 63
SC Kleve was founded in 1906 as Fussball Club Cleve and merged with Spieleverein 1909 Cleve in 1917 to create FC Hohenzollern Cleve. Two years later the club was briefly known as Verein für Jungend und Volksspiele Cleve before becoming part of Turnverein Cleve 1863. In 1924, the footballers left to form an independent club called Sportclub Cleve 1863. After 1925 the city was known as "Kleve" and the sports club adopted the same form.

Following World War II, SC made occasional appearances as a lower table side in third tier football in the Amateurliga Niederrhein. Following the reorganization of German football and the formation of the top-flight Bundesliga in 1963, SC managed another three season of third division play (1963–64, 1969–71) before slipping back to lower level local competition.

VfB Lohengrin 03 Kleve
The Lohengrin side was established in 1903 as VfB Cleve and was made up largely of workers from the "van-den-Berghschen Margarinewerke" earning them the nickname "de Botter". The club's home field  Sportplatz an der Triftstraße was built with the support of the margarine company and on 16 October 1910 was the site of the first international match between Germany and Holland held on German soil (1:2).

This team merged with Turnclub Merkur and Clever Schwimm-Sportclub in 1920 to form Verein für Turn- und Bewegungsspiele Cleve. A new association known as VfL 95 Merkur Cleve was formed out of this club the following year and they quickly re-adopted the traditional name VfB 03 Cleve. After 1925 this side also used the form "Kleve". In January 1946, VfB joined SuL Kleve, itself formed through the 1936 merger of VfB Lohengrin 1921 and FC Sparta 1921 Kleve, to create VfB Lohengrin 03 Kleve.

Like SC, VfB made occasional appearances in third tier football in the Amateurliga Niederrhein and had a similarly undistinguished record at that level.

1. FC Kleve
These key predecessor sides were acknowledged with the adoption of the name 1. FC Kleve 1863/1903 in the 2000 merger that formed the present-day club. In 2003, 1. FC won its way to the Oberliga Nordrhein (IV) where they competed until 2008, when the club earned promotion to the new Regionalliga West. The club has declined since then, being relegated from the Regionalliga in 2009 and the Oberliga in 2011, playing in the tier six Landesliga Niederrhein for a time. A second-place finish in 2014–15 took the club to the play-offs for promotion to what is now the Oberliga Niederrhein which they lost to eventual winner SC Düsseldorf-West with the same result in the following season, this time losing to Cronenberger SC.

Current squad

Honours
SC Kleve 63
 Landesliga Niederrhein 2 (IV)
 Champions: 1969

VfB Lohengrin 03 Kleve
 Landesliga Niederrhein 2 (IV)
 Champions: 1995

1. FC Kleve
 Landesliga Niederrhein 2 (VI)
 Champions: 2002, 2018
 Verbandsliga Niederrhein (V)
 Champions: 2003

References

Grüne, Hardy (2001). Vereinslexikon. Kassel: AGON Sportverlag

External links
Official team site
Abseits Guide to German Soccer
Das deutsche Fußball-Archiv historical German domestic league tables (in German)

Football clubs in Germany
Football clubs in North Rhine-Westphalia
Association football clubs established in 1903
1903 establishments in Germany